Tony Cosmo (born c.1940) is an actor and rock musician famous for his role in Reservoir Dogs, and for appearing in the first live action adaptation of Percy French's poem Abdul Abulbul Amir.

Career
Cosmo's career began in the 1960s, when he fronted a rock and roll band signed with an American label called Fling Records. The group recorded two singles: Wise To You, and Ponytail Annie. Other original compositions included Teenager For President, Give Me Some, The Big Party, and Tiny Hands.

During the 1980s, Cosmo was based in the UK and starred in a series of musical commercials for Whitbread Best Bitter Beer alongside Roy Castle and Blackadder star Tim McInnerny. Cosmo played the Russo-Turkish War era Mameluke Abdul Abulbul Amir who was constantly outwitting the foppish Russian Count portrayed by legendary comedian Stephen Fry. The latter described Cosmo as a "menacing, swarthy character" in his autobiography.

In 1992, Cosmo was cast as a sheriff in Quentin Tarantino's cult film Reservoir Dogs.

References

American male film actors
American rock musicians
Living people
Year of birth missing (living people)
1940s births